Emil George Henry Caswell was the Dean of St George's Cathedral, Georgetown, Guyana, from 1894 until 1910.

Born in 1854, he was educated at Magdalen College, Oxford, and began his career with curacies at St Mary, West Rainton, and St Andrew's, Auckland, before incumbencies at Hunwick and Bishopwearmouth. After his spell overseas he returned to the North East as Vicar of St John's, Darlington. He died of heart failure in Darlington on 16 May 1913, he was 59; he was married to Ethel and had six children.

Notes

1854 births
Alumni of Magdalen College, Oxford
19th-century Guyanese Anglican priests
20th-century Guyanese Anglican priests
Deans of St George's Cathedral, Georgetown
1913 deaths